Cuando llegue el alba is the seventh album by Argentine singer Jorge Cafrune, released in 1964.

Track listing
 "Cuando llegue el alba" 
 "Dudas"     
 "Cueca del guitarrero"     
 "Domingo de agua"     
 "Coplas del pescador"  
 "Hui, jo, jo, jo"
 "Canción de verano y remo"
 "Despedida en una zamba"     
 "Albahaca sin carnaval"
 "Cururú"     
 "Coplas del soltero"
 "Viento, viento...!"

1964 albums
Jorge Cafrune albums